Marcel Anghelescu (1909–1977) was a Romanian stage and film actor.

Partial filmography

 Ziua cumpătării (1942)
 Squadriglia bianca (1944) - Nello
 The Valley Resounds (1950) - Ion
 Arendașul român (1952)
 Vizită (1952)
 Cu Marincea e ceva (1954) - Marinică Busuioc
 A Lost Letter (1954) - Ghiță Pristanda
 Popescu 10 în control (1955)
 Pe răspunderea mea (1956) - Șerban
 Stormy Bird (1957) - Steaga
 O mica întîmplare (1957)
 Două lozuri (1957) - Căpitanul Pandele
 Ciulinii Bărăganului (1957) - Ursu
 Avalanșa (1959) - Matei
 Telegrame (1960) - Popic
 Băieții noștri (1960) - Marian
 Furtuna (1960)
 Bădăranii (1960) - Maurizio
 Darclée (1960) - Ruggero Leoncavallo
 Post restant (1962) - Toma
 Omul de lângă tine (1962)
 Celebrul 702 (1962)
 Cinci oameni la drum (1962) - Dobre
 Partea ta de vină (1963) - Oniga
 Lumina de iulie (1963) - Pavel Serea
 Pași spre lună (1963) - Baronul de Münchhausen
 Mofturi 1900 (1964)
 Mona, l'étoile sans nom (1966) - Station Master
 Corigența domnului profesor (1966) - Andrei Mureșanu
 Castelanii (1967) -  Mădăraș
 Aventuri la Marea Neagra (1972) - Generarul
 Ceața (1973)
 Cantemir (1973)
 Trei scrisori secrete (1974) - Foreman Bocancea
 Frații Jderi (1974) - Iohan Roşu
 Ștefan cel Mare - Vaslui 1475 (1975) - George Amirutzes, Royal Tutor
 Muschetarul român (1975) - Dragus
 Tufă de Veneția (1977)
 Războiul independenței (1977) - Nicolae Fleva
 Severino (1978) - (final film role)

References

Bibliography 
 Goble, Alan. The Complete Index to Literary Sources in Film. Walter de Gruyter, 1999.

External links 
 

1909 births
1977 deaths
People from Craiova
Romanian male film actors
Romanian male stage actors